Chaffey High School is a public high school in Ontario, California, United States. The school currently serves northern Ontario and southern Rancho Cucamonga.

History 

The Chaffey College of Agriculture, founded by the Ontario founders George and William Chaffey, opened on October 15, 1885. The institution, which also had a secondary school, was operated by the University of Southern California until 1901, when it came under the control of the local community and was renamed Ontario High School. In 1911, enrollment was opened to students from Upland and the school was renamed in honor of the Chaffey brothers. Almost all the high school-age students in western San Bernardino County attended Chaffey, a trend that continued until the 1950s. The school's buildings were rebuilt and many new ones were constructed during the government public works programs of the New Deal. Chaffey College continued to operate on the campus until 1960, when it was relocated to the nearby community of Alta Loma.

Demographics 
The demographic breakdown of the 3571 students enrolled for the 2012-2013 school year was:

 Male - 51.6%
 Female - 48.4%
 Native American/Alaskan - 0.2%
 Asian/Pacific islander - 2.2%
 Black - 2.6%
 Hispanic - 86.5%
 White - 6.8%
 Multiracial - 1.7%

In addition, 77.7% of the students were eligible for free or reduced lunch.

Notable alumni 

 Hobie Alter, surfing and sailing entrepreneur
 Jim Brulte, California Assemblyperson
 Andrew J. Crevolin, thoroughbred trainer, winner of 1954 Kentucky Derby
 William De Los Santos, poet, screenwriter and movie director (enrolled as William "Billy" Hilbert)
 Bob Doll, professional basketball player
 Stewart Donaldson, author, positive psychologist, evaluation research scientist
 Bruce Grube, President, St. Cloud State University and Georgia Southern University.
 Nick Leyva, former professional baseball player, manager and coach   
 Larry Maxie, former professional baseball player (Atlanta Braves)
 Anthony Muñoz, professional American football player, 1998 Pro Football Hall of Fame inductee
 Hal Reniff, former professional baseball player (New York Yankees, New York Mets)
 Jon Keyworth, professional American football player, Denver Broncos 1974-1980
 Vicki Morgan, American model murdered in 1983
 Robert Lyn Nelson, artist
 Robert Shaw, conductor
 Gary Wagner, disc jockey
 Joseph Wambaugh, fiction author

References

External links 
 
 

High schools in San Bernardino County, California
Public high schools in California
Educational institutions established in 1911
1911 establishments in California